Fabio Pignatelli is an Italian musician. He is the bass guitar player for the Italian progressive rock band Goblin.  Goblin provided  soundtracks for several horror films, most famously Dario Argento's Suspiria (1977) and George A. Romero's Dawn of the Dead (1978). The band was largely defunct by 1979, but Pignatelli kept the group together, as well as holding onto the name, and the group continued well into the 1990s, with its main lineup restored briefly in 2000.  Because of Pignatelli's operation of a band with the name, they were credited as Simonetti-Pignatelli-Morante for the film, Tenebrae, because the other band members (most importantly, Maurizio Guarini and Carlo Pennisi), most of whom had not worked with Simonetti or Morante, were not involved.

In 2013 he played bass guitar on "Backlit" track from Simulakrum Lab album, vintage synthesizers music project created by Paolo Prevosto.

See also
Tenebrae (soundtrack)

External links
 

Living people
Year of birth missing (living people)
Italian bass guitarists
Male bass guitarists
Progressive rock guitarists